Cameron Duddy (born December 6, 1985) is an American music video director and musician. As a director, he is known for his work with Bruno Mars, OneRepublic, and Fifth Harmony. He is also the bass guitarist in the country music band Midland.

Career

Music video director 
Duddy has directed over 20 music videos, including Mark Ronson and Bruno Mars' "Uptown Funk", Bruno Mars' "24K Magic (song)", and Fifth Harmony's "Worth It".  He has worked with artists like Britney Spears, Jennifer Lopez, OneRepublic, and Iggy Azalea, as well as directing the video for Midland's debut single "Drinkin' Problem", which earned him a CMT nomination for "Best Group Video".

Musician/songwriter 
Duddy is one of the founding members of the country music trio Midland.  Formed in 2016 in Dripping Springs, Texas, it consists of Mark Wystrach (lead vocals), himself as bass guitarist and background vocalist, and Jess Carson (electric guitar, background vocals).  Through Big Machine Records, the band has released a self-titled EP and a studio album, On the Rocks, which has accounted for three charted singles on the Billboard country music charts: "Drinkin' Problem", "Make a Little", and "Burn Out". Midland's musical styles and images are defined by neotraditional country and country rock influences.

Personal life 
Duddy is the son of cinematographer Christopher Duddy and Renee Axotis. He is the stepson of actress Joely Fisher, and stepgrandson of actress Connie Stevens.

He is married to photographer Harper Smith. They have a son, Kitt and daughter, Billie.

Nominations and awards 
2013: MTV Video Music Awards, Best Direction (Locked Out of Heaven)
2015/2017:  MTV Video Music Awards, Best Direction (nominee)
2018: Grammy, Best Country Song (nominee)

References 

1985 births
American music video directors
American country singer-songwriters
American country bass guitarists
Country musicians from Texas
Living people
Singer-songwriters from Texas